Russellville is the county seat and largest city in Pope County, Arkansas, United States, with a 2021 estimated population of 29,338. It is home to Arkansas Tech University. Arkansas Nuclear One, Arkansas' only nuclear power plant is nearby. Russellville borders Lake Dardanelle and the Arkansas River.

It is the principal city of the Russellville Micropolitan Statistical Area, which includes all of Pope and Yell counties.

History

Settlement
Before the town was named Russellville, its vicinity was known as Chactas Prairie, The Prairie, or Cactus Flats. Located on the southern edge of the Ozark Mountains and north of the Arkansas River, this setting was an ideal settlement area.

In the early 19th century, Osage from Missouri hunted frequently in the valley where Russellville is now located. Between 1818 and 1828, the area was within a Cherokee reservation, but the Cherokee people were forcibly moved to Indian Territory (present-day Oklahoma) in 1828, and the land was made available for white settlers by the United States federal government. 

The first house in what is now Russellville, a one-and-a-half-story hand-hewn log house, was built by J.C. Holledger in 1834 and purchased the next year by Dr. Thomas Russell. The first business to be established in the town was an 18 ft by 24 ft general retail store started by Jacob Shinn in 1854.  Shinn replaced the wood structure store with a masonry structure, a building completed in 1876 and which, still standing today, is known as the Shinn Building. It was built at the junction of an east–west road from Lewisburg to Clarksville and a north–south road between Dover and the military road crossing at Norristown on the Arkansas River. The intersection is now Main Street and Denver (formerly River) Street respectively.

Antebellum Period
According to tradition, in the 1840s, the choice of a name for the community of five homes and a store was between Russellville—for Thomas Russell, who had the first home in the area and was a doctor—and Shinnville—for Jacob L. Shinn who established the community's first store.

A post office was established as early as 1854.

American Civil War
As with the war with Mexico in the 1840s, many men of Russellville served in the state's military forces during the American Civil War. Local men served in the state forces early in the war, with many transferring to Confederate regiments by 1862. Several local men were also formed into at least two pro-Union companies. No great battles occurred in or near Russellville, though actions did take place late in the war at nearby Dardanelle (Yell County). While the war came to an official end in 1865, peace did not immediately return to the area. Many areas of Pope County were disrupted in the early 1870s by the turmoil of what came to be known as the Pope County Militia War.

Reconstruction era
The town grew slowly, but during the early 1870s the railroad was built and the town exploded commercially and experienced a boom in population. It connected Russellville to other towns in the area, and ran eventually from Ft. Smith to Little Rock, connecting other river valley towns such as Morrilton, Conway, Atkins, London, and facilitating trade among them. Russellville's first newspaper, the Herald, was founded in 1870. By 1876, the town boasted a population of approximately 800 serviced by fifteen stores, two cotton gins, and six doctors.

Incorporation as a city
On June 7, 1870, Russellville became an incorporated city. Incorporation prompted a debate on moving the county seat, located in Dover since 1841, to one of two growing business centers adjacent to the new tracks. An act to move the county seat passed in the General Assembly in 1873 but was repealed during a special session of the General Assembly in 1874. On March 19, 1887, an election was held on whether to move the county seat to Russellville or to Atkins. Russellville was selected by a margin of 128 votes out of 2,670 total votes cast. The question on moving the county seat had also gone to the voters nearly a decade earlier on September 2, 1878, but the results were overturned in the courts.

While formal education came to the Russellville area early with the founding of nearby Dwight Mission in 1820, most early schools were either private or by subscription. The Russellville Public School District was formed in 1870, the year the city was incorporated. By 1876, it had evolved into a nine-month school. By 1890, approximately 400 students attended in ten grades, and in 1893, the first class to attend through twelve grades graduated.

Most 19th-century residents of the area farmed for a living or, with the coming of the railroad, harvested timber. By the end of the century, Russellville and the surrounding area had become a prosperous coal-mining area, with the Ouita Coal Company being the first established. Other coal companies followed with deep mine shafts sunk north and south of town, which, by the 1950s, had given way to strip mining. Cotton became a profitable crop near Russellville; in the early 20th century, bales were sold from wagons in the middle of Main Street. Today, no coal is mined, and the cotton gins are gone.

20th century

In 1906 the town suffered a massive fire in its central business district. The fire consumed nearly half of the buildings but they were quickly rebuilt, most within six months after the fire.

What today is Arkansas Tech University (ATU) in Russellville was established in 1910 as the Second District Agricultural school—a four-year high school. The school evolved over the years, adding 2 years of college courses in the 1920s and dropping the high school courses at the end of the 1929-1930 academic year with the school's name changed to Arkansas Polytechnic College in 1925. Its name was changed to  Arkansas Tech University in 1976.

With America's entry into World War II, many Russellville men enlisted or were drafted into the military. Many of the local men served in the 153rd Infantry. Battery D and Battery F of the 206th Coast Artillery Regiment of the Arkansas National Guard were initially stationed at ATU. Many of the men saw service in Alaska in what is known as the Williwaw War.

After the war, the construction of Interstate 40 in 1956 sparked Russelville's growth. The highway has been a boon to the area's growth, much like the railroad was in the 1870s. A major economic boost came as a result of the completion of a dam near the Arkansas River crossing between Dardanelle and Russellville in 1965. The dam created a lake, which led to the establishment of Lake Dardanelle State Park, a major tourist attraction in the area. The completion of the lock and power dam, a part of the McClellan-Kerr Arkansas River Navigation System, which brings in between $1 to $2 billion in trade to the state each year, has greatly improved the area's business prospects.
During the 1970s, the town, like so many other small American towns, witnessed the decentralization of its historic downtown area, due to the advent of large retail outlets such as Wal-Mart. Many of the historic buildings were left to decay or were torn down. Also in the 1970s, Arkansas' only nuclear power plant, Arkansas Nuclear One, was built just outside the city, on Lake Dardanelle. The plant brought more people and jobs to the city.

Geography
Russellville is located at  (35.278429, -93.136820). It is located on the Arkansas River.

Climate
The climate in this area is characterized by hot, humid summers and generally mild to cool winters. According to the Köppen Climate Classification system, Russellville has a humid subtropical climate, abbreviated "Cfa" on climate maps.

Demographics

2020 census

As of the 2020 United States census, there were 28,940 people, 10,184 households, and 5,858 families residing in the city.

2010 census
As of the 2010 Census, there were 27,920 people, 10,318 households, and 6,383 families residing in the city. The racial makeup of the city was 83.2% White, 5.5% Black or African American, 0.7% Native American, 1.6% Asian, 0.0% Pacific Islander, 6.7% from other races, and 2.3% from two or more races. 11.7% of the population were Hispanic or Latino of any race.

There were 10,318 households, out of which 28.9% had children under the age of 18 living with them, 42.3% were married couples living together, 14.4% had a female householder with no husband present, and 38.1% were non-families. 30.1% of all households were made up of individuals, and 10.5% had someone living alone who was 65 years of age or older. The average household size was 2.39 and the average family size was 2.97.

In the city, the population was spread out, with 22.6% under the age of 18, 21.4% from 18 to 24, 23.8% from 25 to 44, 19.9% from 45 to 64, and 12.4% who were 65 years of age or older. The median age was 29.1 years. For every 100 females, there were 95.7 males. For every 100 females age 18 and over, there were 93.8 males.

The median income for a household in the city was $38,234, and the median income for a family was $49,440. Males had a median income of $30,133 versus $19,906 for females. The per capita income for the city was $19,637. About 14.5% of families and 18.8% of the population were below the poverty line, including 25.8% of those under age 18 and 9.1% of those age 65 or over.

Economy
Arkansas corporations Tyson Foods, Inc. and Innovation Industries Elevator Signal Fixtures are among the nearly fifty manufacturing plants employing more than 8,300 people. Overall, there are more than ten divisions of Fortune 500 companies located in Russellville. There is a diverse manufacturing base located in the city including: Frozen dinners, railroad crossties, elevator signal fixtures, parking meters, aluminum foil, graphite electrodes, Microplanes, and aircraft and automotive parts.

Media
Russellville's local newspaper is The Courier, which is published six days a week (every day except Monday).

ABOUT the River Valley magazine, a monthly publication distributed across five counties (Pope, Yell, Johnson, Conway, and Logan) of the Arkansas River Valley region, is based in Russellville.

TV stations that reach Russellville are either from the Little Rock or Fort Smith markets as Russellville is on the "fringe" of both service areas. Russellville receives KFSM-TV (CBS) and KFTA-TV (FOX) from Fort Smith and KARK-TV (NBC) and KATV-TV (ABC) from Little Rock. The farther away from the city center one is, the likelihood becomes greater that one will receive the full package of channels from one market over the other (Fort Smith to the west and Little Rock to the east of town).

Several commercial radio stations serve the city, including KWKK-FM 100.9, KARV-AM 610 and KWXT-AM 1490, all of which are licensed to Russellville. In addition, radio stations KCJC-FM 102.3 and KCAB-AM 980 (both licensed to Dardanelle, AR); KVLD-FM 99.3 (licensed to Atkins, AR); KARV-FM 101.3 (licensed to Ola, AR) and KYEL-FM 105.5 (licensed to Danville, AR) have their studios in Russellville.

There are also two non-commercial radio stations operating in Russellville: KMTC-FM 91.1 and KXRJ-FM 91.9 (the radio station licensed to Arkansas Tech University).

Tourism
Russellville is known for its local music, art scene, and historic downtown area. The most notable of these events is the Art Walk. On the first Friday night of each quarter (March, June, September, and December), the city hosts the Downtown Art Walk, in which the public may listen to live music, taste wine and food, and appreciate, purchase and sell art while connecting with the community, as well as have their picture taken in the Alley.

Russellville hosts a variety of sporting events and fishing tournaments, due to its location on Lake Dardanelle. Russellville is also close to Mt. Nebo and other state parks such as Lake Dardanelle State Park. Also many people commute to Russellville on a daily basis from its surrounding areas, for both work and recreation.

Russellville is also home to the Pope County Fairgrounds, which hosts many events ranging from horse racing to fairs and conventions. At the end of every summer, Russellville is also host to the annual Pope county fair, which features rides, live music, livestock, games, and other forms of entertainment. The county fair attracts more than 50,000 visitors each year.

Education
Russellville is home to Arkansas Tech University, which was founded in 1909 and as of 2014 has 12,003 students.

Russellville is within the Russellville School District, which operates Russellville High School.

Russellville is also home to the Alternative learning center, which is made up of SLC (student learning center), SDC (student detention center), and an adult education center. The SLC program allows failing students to get more individualized attention so that they can catch up with the rest of their classmates or attain their high school diploma. The SDC program serves like an in-school suspension and serves students ranging from middle to high school. The adult learning center allows high school dropouts to come back and obtain their high school diplomas or GEDs.

In popular culture
In 2013, Russellville was chosen as one of the filming locations for the independent Christian film "Cowboys and Jesus". One scene was filmed at Cyclone Stadium, depicting a football game in which locals from the area were invited to attend, appearing as "extras".

Russellville power plant, Arkansas Nuclear One was featured in a 2011 episode of Aerial America on the Smithsonian Channel.

Notable people
American composer Scott Bradley, most known for his works in Tom and Jerry (MGM) cartoons, was from Russellville.<ref>"Scott Bradley", ..Tom and Jerry Online.</ref>
Natalie Canerday, actress (Sling Blade, October Sky, Walk the Line), graduated from Russellville High School.
Jeff Davis, Democratic United States Senator from Arkansas and the 20th governor of the state, lived in Russellville.
Trevor Drown, Republican member of the Arkansas House of Representatives for Pope and Van Buren counties since 2015; Libertarian Party nominee for United States Senate in 2010. 
Jelly Gardner, baseball player in the Negro leagues.
Elizabeth Gracen, crowned Miss America in 1982, is a 1979 graduate of Russellville High School.
Brooks Hays began his law practice in Russellville with his father before he became a U.S. representative and an advisor to U.S. Presidents John F. Kennedy and Lyndon B. Johnson.
NFL punter and College All-American Greg Horne graduated from Russellville High School in 1983.
Gary Johnston, U.S. Army major general and commander of Intelligence and Security Command, was a native of Russellville.
Andrea Lea, Republican member of the Arkansas House of Representatives from Russellville since 2009; candidate for state auditor in 2014.
Famed knife maker Jimmy Lile was a Russellville native, best known for his work involving the Rambo'' film series.
NFL player and All-Pro selection Eddie Meador graduated RHS in 1955, and played college football at Arkansas Tech University.
Professional wrestler and reality television star Matt Riviera was born and raised in Russellville.
Greg Standridge, Republican member of the Arkansas State Senate from Russellville since 2015.
NBA player Corliss Williamson is a 1992 graduate of Russellville High School.
United States congressman Steve Womack was born in Russellville. He is a 1975 graduate of Russellville High School and 1979 graduate of Arkansas Tech University.
Kerry Shook, minister, best-selling author, and Senior Pastor of Woodlands Church in The Woodlands, Texas is a Russellville native.

Gallery

See also

 List of cities and towns in Arkansas
 National Register of Historic Places listings in Pope County, Arkansas

References

External links

 Main Street Russellville at Main Street Russellville, Inc.
 Russellville Public Library at the Pope County Library System

 
1870 establishments in Arkansas
Cities in Arkansas
Cities in Pope County, Arkansas
County seats in Arkansas
Populated places established in 1870
Arkansas populated places on the Arkansas River